Michael Griffiths may refer to:

Michael Ambrose Griffiths, English Roman Catholic bishop
Mike Griffiths, Welsh rugby union player
Mike Griffiths (police officer), Chief Constable of the UK's Civil Nuclear Constabulary
Michael Griffiths (TV personality)

See also

Michael Griffith (disambiguation)
Michael Griffin (disambiguation)